Saint Yared (Ge'ez: ቅዱስ ያሬድ; 25 April 505  – 20 May 571) was an  Aksumite composer in the 6th century. Often credited with the forerunner of traditional music of Ethiopia and Eritrea, he developed the music of the Ethiopian Orthodox Church and Eritrean Orthodox Church, in broder context the  Coptic Orthodox Church and  Syriac Orthodox Church the use in liturgical music, as well as the Ethiopian musical notation system. Additionally, he composed Zema, or the chant tradition of Ethiopia, particularly the chants of the Ethiopian-Eritrean Orthodox Tewahedo Churches, which are still performed today.

St. Yared was from Axum; according to traditional legend, his earlier education was dwindled after his father death, and his mother subsequently sent him to parish priest Abba Gedeon. Upon embarking exile to his uncle's birthplace in Murade Qal, St. Yared remorsed from his failure in education after he saw exemplification of a caterpillar's effort to climb up a tree to its peak. 
Stimulated by the caterpillar's success, St. Yared gained confidence in his worth and subsequently achieved his success in later life. He became priest of the Holy Ark of Sion. During the reign of Emperor Gebre Meskel (son of Emperor Kaleb), St. Yared significantly gained prominence for his musical style and the emperor beloved him.

During Nine Saints expedition from Byzantine Empire, St. Yared cooperated with them to build several churches in location of Lake Tana, Begemder and in Tigray Province. One of the church called Saint Mariam was founded together after debilitating journey in the location of Zur Amba. In Abune Aragawi's Gadla Aragawi account, the name "Zur Amba" derived from God's appearance in order to guide him to the east side to build the church.

He is regarded as a saint of the Ethiopian-Eritrean Orthodox Church with his feast day celebrated on 19 May.  His name is from the Biblical person known in English as "Jared" (Book of Genesis 5:15).

Traditional account
It was widely accepted that St. Yared was born on 25 April 505 in the city of Axum, Axumite Kingdom from his mother Tauklia and his father Adam. When he reached six, his parent gave him tutelage of Yishaq, who was a teacher of Axum. Under his instruction, St. Yared completed alphabet and Psalms. Yishaq brought St. Yared back to his parent and his father died. Unable to raise him, his mother Tauklia left him to his uncle Abba Gedeon, who was a parish priest. Gedeon was a teacher of Old and New Testament in Saint Mary of Sion and he began translating Holy Scriptures into Ge'ez from Hebrew and Greek. At that time St. Yared was in poor education and unable to acquire knowledge, which led him severe punishments and mockery at school. Aware of his failure, St. Yared decided to go on to his uncle's birthplace Medebai Welel. Due to heavy rain, St. Yared sheltered under a nearby tree in place of Murade Qal.

Pondering his life, St. Yared rested and noticed a caterpillar climbing the tree to eat leaves. The caterpillar continued to fall down, but eventually it succeeded to reach its destination. St. Yared wept and returned to Gedeon and pledge him not to offend. Gedeon began teaching Psalms. St. Yared subsequently moved to Saint Mary of Sion for prayer. When St. Yared was fourteen, Gedeon died; St. Yared took his mastering position.

He then returned to Axum at the age of nine, becoming the chief priest in Holy Ark of Sion. Soon after, St. Yared composed "Ariam".

While at Axum, St. Yared created musical notations and alphabets, as well as mequamia.

During the 14-year rule of King Gebre Meskel (the son of King Kaleb) from 525 to 539, St. Yared became a dominant musical figure in Axum. He proclaimed as the greatest poet and the King favored him. Soon after St. Yared composed Zema, resulting in his succession in church service. During this, St. Yared decided to live with ascetics and requested to the Emperor:
Promise to grant me...allow me to retire from my work in the court and to live among the people so that I may devote the rest of my life teaching, to meditation and to prayer.    
Though Gebre Meskel resented by his retirement, he kept his promise and granted him to leave his service. St. Yared travelled to Semien Mountains.

St. Yared become a pioneer of observing Hossana, also called Palm Sunday in Axum. He divided hymns into four parts: winter, summer, autumn and spring. He completed the Book of Deggua, (De'guaa) in Tigrinya, which means "lamentations". Deggua divides into three chanting modes: Ge'ez, Ezel, Araray. Ge'ez relies a plain chant for ordinary days, Ezel is increased measured beat for funeral and Araray is a free mode, light beats for festivals. The highest part of Deggua is Mahlet St. Yared (hymn of St. Yared). Those three chants represent the Trinity.

St. Yared also composed ten tones with notations, unlike the European modes consisting of six notes. St. Yared then developed their arrangements calling "Seraye", which signifies hymnary guideline. The glyphs of notations consist of dashes, dots and curves. Tsome Deggua is written for Lent, Me'eraf is sung for Sabbath vigils, Zimare is for Holy Communion, Mewasit is for funerals, requierems and Eastern Eve and Quidase is for Communion. These books spend nine years in order to complete.

The Nine Saints, who were expelled by religious persecution from Byzantine Empire and who reached Ethiopia in the 5th century, met with St. Yared, with whom he visited individual churches and aid them to build with assistance of Axumite Emperors. St. Yared also consecrated Debre Damo churches founded by Abuna Aregawi. One place where St. Yared successfully gave mastery is St. Qirkos in Lake Tana.

St. Yared communication with one of saint named Abba Pantelewon was expedient. Pantelewon told that St. Yared knew Western tradition and he went to Constantinople once. He recalled that "I went to Rome [Second Rome Constatinople] where I saw a Church, I knew her and loved her like my own sister, a few years later, I visited her again during the time she was bathing in the river Tigre."

Through assistance of Pantelewon, Aragawi and Abba Yesehaq, St. Yared acknowledged the Western culture. According to Tarika Nagast and Gadla Aragawi, King Gebre Meskel, Aragawi and St. Yared maintained stable friendship for establishing churches at Lake Tana, Begemder and Tigray. After two years, they went to Gayint and built a church called Saint Mariam at Zur Amba. The foundation is said to be as a result of "God's guide" and this location was named Zur Amba after "appearance of God to Aragawi". The account wrote about God's appearance and guidance to Aragawi in Ge'ez: "Zur Abba Mengale Misraq...." which means "...Abba, turn to the east; you will find the way to the hill."

Later life and death 
On the coronation of Gebre Meskel, Yared placed a wreath of flower to crown on him. The event is found in Deggua.

St. Yared died at the age of 66 on 20 May 571 in a cave of Semien Mountains. He had been traveling to teach.

19 May is conceived as his feast day and the Orthodox Tewahedo Church venerate in commemoration of his "disappearance".

In popular culture
Little known of the life of St. Yared outside the traditional account. St. Yared thought to gather his pupils to teach his musical system after being asceticism in monastic life. He has been said to bequeath musical heir where the practice also revolutionize "a genealogy of masters from St. Yared in the 6th-century to Aleqa Mersha in the 20th-century." St. Yared's chant and voice revered as powerful; his performance on liturgical music outstrip into secular domain, where "the remark [is] often made of a good singer; his voice makes one cry." His work has been contested to controversy by religious and secular discourse. Secular teaching argued that St. Yared is the base and father of secular music. The outlook of "secular music" strongly objected by Orthodox Church. Another challenges are spiritual songs in audio and audiovisual form is possible without original hymn. Without proper knowledge, some musicians prepare religious music and some singers taken to secular form. The most contentious is the use of church treasures such as drum, sistrum, clothes and stick currently used by Protestant followers. Some of St. Yared's song like "Yekome Were", "Yetegulet Digua", "Yeankober Wereb", Yewashera Qine", Yeachabr Wereb", "Yeselelkula Kidase", "Ye Aba Giorgis" and "Ze Gasicha Seatat" are becoming obsolete or few scholars have no students.

Reception
St. Yared regarded by Ethiopian Studies scholars as the founder of qene. His musical work swayed Yohannes of Gebla in Wollo and Tewanei of Deg Istifa in Gojjam, who improvised into complex forms. The work also contributed for service from time of day to day of year, depending on valuable occasional feasts and religious season. Deggua's summary opening by:
Oh! Music!...

Ah! Music that I heard the angels' sing in Heaven

Uttering Holy! Holy! Lord!

The Heavens and the Earth are filled with

Your holy praise
Tradition holds that St. Yared ascended to Heaven supported by angels Seraph and Cherub, singing "Holy! Holy! Holy!", a paraphrase of Ancient of Days in Book of Daniel.  In addition, it augmented supernatural entities bolstered him: three white angels, three white birds singing with animals and beasts. His compositions also reflect agriculture and seasons. For example, for rainy season (mid-June to mid-September) and for harvest season (mid-September to mid-December):
Rainy season
Listen to the sound of the footsteps of the rain!

When the rains pour down, the poor rejoice.

Listen to the sound of the footsteps of the rain!

When the rains pour down, the hungry are satiated...

The clouds hear and obey His word;

And the streams brim with water.

And the furrows quench their thirst...
Harvest season
In its own time, the rainy season has passed.

Now is established the season of plenty.

Behold! The plants have blossomed and brought fourth fruit...

See also
Ethiopian chant

References

External links
A brief History of Saint Yared 
Biography of Saint Yared 
 By Ayele Bekerie. Who is St. Yared – the Great  and the First Ethiopian Composer. Tadias Magazine, Nov 29, 2007. 
 Charles L. Chavis Jr. Saint Yared

Yared
505 births
571 deaths
6th-century Christian saints
People from the Aksumite Empire
Ethiopian musicians
Ethiopian saints
6th-century composers